This is a list of film festivals in the Czech Republic.

Active festivals

Defunct

Film festivals

Czech Republic
Czech Republic
Film festivals